The following article is a summary of the 2019 Indonesia national football team results.

Men's football team 
Included just match against country

Record

Goalscorers

Managers of 2019

Fixtures and results

Friendly matches

International friendly match

2022 FIFA World Cup and 2023 AFC Asian Cup joint qualification

Men's Under-23 football team

2019 AFF U-22 Youth Championship

2020 AFC U-23 Championship qualification

2019 Southeast Asian Games

Men's under-19 football team

2019 AFF U-18 Youth Championship

2020 AFC U-19 Championship qualification

Men's Under-17 football team

2019 AFF U-15 Boys' Championship

2020 AFC U-16 Championship qualification

Notes

References 

Indonesia
2019